Jankovich may refer to:

 6589 Jankovich, a minor planet
 Jankovich (surname), people with the surname

See also 
 Yankovic, a surname
 Janković, a surname